The Knockout Stage of the 1997 Fed Cup Europe/Africa Zone Group I was the final stage of the Zonal Competition involving teams from Europe and Africa. Those that qualified for this stage placed first and second in their respective pools.

The eight teams were then randomly drawn into two two-stage knockout tournaments, with the winners advancing to the World Group II Play-offs.

Draw

Semifinals

Russia vs. Israel

Sweden vs. Belarus

Italy vs. Greece

Hungary vs. Slovenia

Finals

Russia vs. Belarus

  advanced to the World Group II Play-offs, where they were drawn against . They won 4–1, and thus proceeded to the 1998 World Group II.

Italy vs. Hungary

  advanced to the World Group II Play-offs, where they were drawn against . They won 5–0, and thus proceeded to the 1998 World Group II.

See also
Fed Cup structure

References

External links
 Fed Cup website

1997 Fed Cup Europe/Africa Zone